The Solz is a river in Hesse, Germany. It flows into the Fulda in Bebra, about 15 km downstream from another Fulda tributary named Solz. It has a length of 10.8 km (6.7mi).

See also
List of rivers of Hesse

References

Rivers of Hesse
Rivers of Germany